Latin Pard (also Romanized as Latīn Pard; also known as Latīmpūrd and Latīn Part) is a village in Aliyan Rural District, Sardar-e Jangal District, Fuman County, Gilan Province, Iran. At the 2006 census, its population was 64, in 16 families.

References 

Populated places in Fuman County